Efrem "E. J." Montgomery Jr. (born September 12, 1999) is an American basketball player for Soproni KC of the Nemzeti Bajnokság I/A. He played college basketball for the Kentucky Wildcats.

High school career
Montgomery attended Lincoln Park Academy in Fort Pierce, Florida for middle school and started playing at the varsity level as a 6'8" seventh grader. As an eighth grader, Montgomery and the Greyhounds won the Florida District 12-4A championship. 

Montgomery first attended Montverde Academy for his freshmen and sophomore year, where he played alongside current Net Ben Simmons.

He later transferred to Wheeler High School for his junior and senior year. He averaged 25.6 points, 13.6 rebounds, and 4.3 assists at Wheeler.

Recruiting
Montgomery originally committed to Auburn University on September 22, 2016. However, when Auburn was involved in the college basketball corruption scandal, Montgomery decommited on September 27, 2017.

On April 9, 2018, Montgomery committed to play college basketball at the University of Kentucky.

College career
Montgomery had his first double-double of 11 points and 13 rebounds in a win over South Carolina. As a freshman, Montgomery averaged 3.8 points and 4.1 rebounds per game. On December 7, 2019, Montgomery scored a career-high 25 points as Kentucky defeated Fairleigh Dickinson 83–52. In the regular season finale versus Florida, Montgomery hit the game-winning tip-in with 11 seconds left. He averaged 6.1 points, 5.4 rebounds, and 1.1 blocks per game. Following the season, he declared for the 2020 NBA draft.

Professional career
After going undrafted in the 2020 NBA draft, Montgomery signed with the Milwaukee Bucks. He was waived on December 17.

On January 4, 2021, he signed with Nevėžis-OPTIBET of the Lithuanian Basketball League. On September 1, Montgomery signed with Soproni KC of the Nemzeti Bajnokság I/A.

On August 3, 2022, Montgomery signed with Aomori Wat's of the Japanese B.League.

Career statistics

College

|-
| style="text-align:left;"| 2018–19
| style="text-align:left;"| Kentucky
| 37 || 10 || 15.1 || .480 || .200 || .567 || 4.1 || .4 || .4 || 1.0 || 3.8 
|-
| style="text-align:left;"| 2019–20
| style="text-align:left;"| Kentucky
| 28 || 25 || 24.1 || .518 || .167 || .667 || 5.4 || .6 || .4 || 1.1 || 6.1
|- class="sortbottom"
| style="text-align:center;" colspan="2"| Career
| 65 || 35 || 19.0 || .500 || .188 || .625 || 4.6 || .5 || .4 || 1.1 || 4.8

Personal life
E. J. is the son of Efrem and Glenda Montgomery and has two sisters Brittni and Brandy.

References

External links
Kentucky Wildcats bio
USA Basketball bio

1999 births
Living people
American men's basketball players
American expatriate basketball people in Lithuania
Aomori Wat's players
Basketball players from Florida
BC Nevėžis players
Kentucky Wildcats men's basketball players
McDonald's High School All-Americans
Montverde Academy alumni
People from Fort Pierce, Florida
Power forwards (basketball)